Plakortis communis is a species of marine sponge in the order Homosclerophorida, first described in 2011 by Guilherme Muricy.

Distribution
The holotype was collected off Cartier Island, Western Australia, and the species is found in the IMCRA regions of  "Timor Province", "Southwest Shelf Transition", and "Northeast Shelf Province", that is, off the Queensland coast and the North & South-west coasts of Western Australia.

References

Homoscleromorpha
Animals described in 2011
Sponges of Australia
Taxa named by Guilherme Muricy